Elmhurst, also known as the William H. Tarr House or William and Carol Lynn Residence, is a historic country home located at Wellsburg, Brooke County, West Virginia. It was built in 1848, and is a two-story, five bay, rectangular brick dwelling with a hipped roof in the Greek Revival style.  It sits on a stone ashlar foundation and features a single bay portico with a hipped roof supported by Tuscan order columns. Also on the property is a contributing small barn.

It was listed on the National Register of Historic Places in 1986.

References

Houses on the National Register of Historic Places in West Virginia
Greek Revival houses in West Virginia
Houses completed in 1848
Houses in Brooke County, West Virginia
National Register of Historic Places in Brooke County, West Virginia